Nebtawyre Mentuhotep IV was the last king of the 11th Dynasty in the Middle Kingdom. He seems to fit into a 7-year period in the Turin Canon for which there is no recorded king.

Family

King's Mother Imi
In Wadi Hammamat, a rock inscription (Hammamat M 191) with the royal name of Mentuhotep IV also mentions King's Mother Imi. This monument only focus on the title King's Mother, presumably the mother of Mentuhotep IV. It does not include other titles like King's Wife, King's Sister or King's Daughter. Some have speculated that she was a concubine in the royal harem.

Mentuhotep III or Mentuhotep II
It is not certain who was the father of Mentuhotep IV. Most scholars suggest that he was the son and successor of Mentuhotep III. However, it is also possible that he was a son of Mentuhotep II, thus a brother or half-brother of Mentuhotep III. The fact that he has been omitted from several king lists indicate that there was a crisis in the order of succession. He also represents the last king of the eleventh dynasty, and his reign is poorly documented indicating turmoil.

Rock inscriptions
He is known from several inscriptions at several locations, despite his reign being omitted from the Abydos king list. The inscriptions show the organization and makeup of a large expedition during his reign.

Wadi el-Hudi
Also, he is attested by the inscriptions at Wadi el-Hudi.

Ain Sukhna
At the red sea port of Ain Sukhna expeditions went to places like the Wadi Maghareh in the Sinai. Products like turqouise and copper were transported to Memphis some 120 km across the sand tracks of the Eastern Desert. Or perhaps transported along the Red Sea coast further south to the port of Mersa Gawasis. Inscriptions dated to Mentuhotep IV have been found.

Year 1, arrival of the king’s men; workforce: 3000, to bring back turquoise, copper,3 bronze (?) and all fine products of the desert. [rnpt-zp 1: jwt mšʿ n nswt; ṯnw n mšʿ pn 3000 n s r jnt mfkȝt, bjȝ, ḥsmn (?), jnw nb(w) nfr(w) n ḫȝst]

Wadi Hammamat
He is known from a few inscriptions in Wadi Hammamat that record expeditions to the Red Sea coast and to quarry stone for the royal monuments. One of these inscriptions confirms the name of his mother to be King's Mother Imi. The leader of an expedition to Wadi Hammamat, during the second year of Mentuhotep IV’s reign, was his vizier, Amenemhat, who is assumed to be the future king Amenemhat I, the first king of the 12th Dynasty, and Mentuhotep's immediate successor.

Other attestations
A fragment of a slate bowl found at Lisht North was regarded for a long time to be inscribed on the outside with the official titulary of Mentuhotep IV, and on the inside with that of King Amenemhat I, his successor. Since the two inscriptions are incised in a different style of writing, according to Dorothea Arnold, this indicates that Amenemhat had his name added to an older vessel that already bore the name of Mentuhotep IV. However, Peter Janosi showed that Mentuhotep IV is not mentioned on the bowl, the titulary preserved there fits better to Mentuhotep II.

End of reign
It is assumed by some Egyptologists that Amenemhat either usurped the throne or assumed power after Mentuhotep IV died childless. There is currently no archaeological or textual evidence to prove that Mentuhotep was deposed by his vizier or that he chose Amenemhat to be his designated successor. Neither his mummy nor his burial place have been found.

See also
 Eleventh Dynasty of Egypt family tree

References

Further reading

Pharaohs of the Eleventh Dynasty of Egypt
20th-century BC Pharaohs
20th-century BC deaths
Year of birth unknown